"Bomber's Moon" was an American television play broadcast live on May 22, 1958, as part of the CBS television series, Playhouse 90. It was the 35th episode of the second season of Playhouse 9o.

Rod Serling wrote the teleplay about American fliers stationed in England during World War II. John Frankenheimer directed. Robert Cummings, Rip Torn, Hazel Court, and Martin Balsam starred.

Plot
An American bomber wing is stationed in England during World War II. The commanding officer, Col. Culver, is emotionless.  He accuses a young flier of cowardice.

Cast
 Robert Cummings as Col. Culver
 Rip Torn as Lt. Harrison
 Hazel Court as Mary Jarvis
 Martin Balsam as Capt. Mantell
 Larry Gates as Major
 J. Pat O'Malley as Pub keeper
 Cliff Robertson hosted the show.

Production
Martin Manulis was the producer and John Frankenheimer the director. Rod Serling wrote the teleplay.

Frankenheimer said of Cummings: "Bobby's a really fine dramatic actor, but people usually associate him only with comedy. Naturally enough I suppose. Directing an actor like this who feels immediately what the script wants and what the director wants makes you love this business."

Reception
In The New York Times, John P. Shanley praised Serling's dialogue as "fresh and striking", though occasionally "ornate and labored." He also praised the performances of Cummings, Torn, and Balsam.

References

1958 television plays
Playhouse 90 (season 2) episodes
1958 American television episodes